"Because We Can" is the first single released from Bon Jovi's twelfth studio album, What About Now. The single premiered on radio on January 7, 2013. Richie Sambora characterized the new material as a compilation of "different elements"; yet reassured old fans that they will be just as pleased with the new work as they have been with the old for over 30 years.

Commercial performance
As of March 20, 2013, the song has sold 83,000 copies in the US.

Critical reception
"Because We Can" has received mixed reviews from critics, with critics either giving the song extremely positive or extremely negative feedback. Rick Florino of Artistdirect gave "Because We Can" a review of 5 out of 5 stars, calling the song "epic" and "invigorating" and favorably comparing it to their previous song "It's My Life". Billy Dukes of UltimateClassicRock.com reacted negatively to the song, giving it a rating of 3/10 and calling it "too damn cheery" and "mainstream", and dubbed the chorus "hackneyed". Glenn Gamboa of Newsday gave the song a rating of 3 out of 4 stars, calling the "fresh" song "distinctly-present day" and "upbeat", however unfavorably compared the song to Fun, saying that the song was "off-putting" and would not gain the band any new fans. Melinda Newman of HitFix gave the song a B- and called it "anthemic" and "populist", however stated that the song would not change anyone's opinion on the band if they did not like them to begin with. Newman called Jon Bon Jovi's vocals in the song "nasally", however stated that the song was "far better" than their 2009 song "We Weren't Born to Follow". Simon Ramsay of Stereoboard.com agreed with Newman that the song would not change anyone's opinion on the band, giving the song a rating of 3 out of 5 stars, unfavorably calling it "easily the most commercial piece of pop candy" that the band has ever done.

Music video
The music video for the song, directed by Fisher Stevens, premiered on January 29, 2013. It shows the band performing at a boxing arena. There are four different versions of the video, with titles "The Original", "The Boxer: Act 1", "Astrid: Act 2" and "The Beginning: Epilogue".

Track listing

Chart performance

Weekly charts

Year-end charts

References

Bon Jovi songs
2013 singles
Songs written by Billy Falcon
Songs written by Jon Bon Jovi
Songs written by Richie Sambora
Island Records singles
2013 songs